Francisco Javier Chico Goerne Cobián (born 15 November 1960) is a Mexican politician from the National Action Party. From 2000 to 2003 he served as Deputy of the LVIII Legislature of the Mexican Congress representing Guanajuato, and previously served in the Congress of Guanajuato.

References

1960 births
Living people
Politicians from Guanajuato
National Action Party (Mexico) politicians
20th-century Mexican politicians
21st-century Mexican politicians
Universidad Michoacana de San Nicolás de Hidalgo alumni
Members of the Congress of Guanajuato
Deputies of the LVIII Legislature of Mexico
Members of the Chamber of Deputies (Mexico) for Guanajuato